The Generality Lands, Lands of the Generality or Common Lands were about one fifth of the territories of the United Provinces of the Netherlands, that were directly governed by the States-General. Unlike the seven provinces of Holland, Zeeland, Utrecht, Guelders, Overijssel, Friesland and Groningen, these territories had no States-Provincial and were not represented in the central government. At the time of the Union of Utrecht, these territories were under Spanish control, and would only be conquered by the Dutch Republic later in the war. From an economic point of view, they were exploited with heavy taxes and levies. As one author puts it: "Back in the Dutch lap, these so-called Generality lands were for a long time governed as a sort of internal colonies, in which Catholics were seen as second-class citizens."

History

In the latter years of the Eighty Years' War the Generality Lands came under control of the Dutch Republic, and this situation was consolidated by the Treaty of Westphalia in 1648. Most of the territories had no provincial government because they were cut off from their original governments, which remained under Spanish rule. In contrast to the northern seven provinces, the population of the Generality Lands was overwhelmingly Roman Catholic. The prefix  indicates that this part of the province was under general States rule, as a dependent territory. For both the Generality Lands and the Dutch colonies, sovereignty was claimed by the Generality on the basis right of conquest.

Brabant of the States: the northern part of the Duchy of Brabant, most of the present province of North Brabant
Flanders of the States: the northern part of the County of Flanders, present Zeelandic Flanders and nowadays part of the province of Zeeland
The city of Maastricht was a condominium of the United Provinces and the Prince-Bishopric of Liège.  literally means "beyond the Meuse" or "Trans-Meuse" (from the perspective of Brussels). The 19th century term "Staats-Limburg", invented for nationalistic reasons, is historically and geographically incorrect.
Upper Guelders of the States: as a result of the Treaty of Utrecht (1713) a part of Spanish Guelders, including Venlo and Echt, was ceded to the United Provinces, while another part went to Prussia and a small part around Roermond was left for the Austrian duchy of Guelders.
Westerwolde and Wedde: what is now the southeastern part of the province of Groningen was a generality land between 1594 and 1619, after which it became part of that province.

After the French occupation of the Southern Netherlands and the proclamation of the Batavian Republic in 1795 the Generality Lands ceased to exist. Staats-Vlaanderen became part of the French  Escaut.  and  became parts of the French  of Roer and Meuse-Inférieure.

Territories of the Dutch Republic outside Europe were also under general States rule, for example Staten Island in present-day New York City. New Zealand was also originally called Staten Landt after its Dutch discovery.

References

Dutch Republic
Historical regions in the Netherlands
Former polities in the Netherlands
History of Limburg (Netherlands)
History of North Brabant
History of Zeeland
Zeelandic Flanders